The black-hooded coucal (Centropus steerii) is a species of cuckoo in the family Cuculidae. It is endemic to Mindoro in the Philippines and is one of the most endangered birds in the country. It is threatened by habitat loss and trapping.

Description 
EBird describes the bird as "A large, long-tailed bird of lowland primary forest on Mindoro with a brown back and belly, dark wings with brown-edged feathers, a dark tail with a bluish iridescence, and a black hood with some light streaking on the back of the neck. Note the strong curved bill. Similar to Philippine coucal, but has a brown rather than black belly and is restricted to primary forest rather than more open habitats. Song is a descending series of very deep hoots."

Habitat and conservation status 
Its natural habitat is tropical moist lowland forest. It is threatened by habitat loss with Mindoro having a great loss of forest in recent decades. By 1988, extensive deforestation on Mindoro had reduced forest cover to a mere 120 km2, of which only a small proportion is below this species's upper altitudinal limit. The lowland forest that does remain is highly fragmented and it is believed that at the current rate of deforestation all forest may disappear by 2020–2030. Slash-and-burn cultivation, occasional selective logging and rattan collection threaten the forest fragments that still support the species. Dynamite blasting for marble is an additional threat to forest at Puerto Galera. The species's genetic viability may be at risk given the small size and fragmented nature of remaining populations. As a consequence, it is now classified as critically endangered by the IUCN with an estimated population of just 50 - 249 mature individuals. 

In order to combat extinction, local education programs have been initiated, surveys have been executed, and ecotourism has been promoted in order to encourage locals to take to more sustainable occupations. The Zoological Society of London has described the bird as an EDGE species, listed as the top 21 distinct-endangered bird species in the world. Conservation actions proposed by the IUCN include more surveys to better understand population, to better protect the remaining lowland forests and to raise awareness on this species.

References

External links
BirdLife Species Factsheet.

black-hooded OWAK
Birds of Mindoro
Critically endangered fauna of Asia
black-hooded coucal
black-hooded coucal
black-hooded coucal
Taxonomy articles created by Polbot